Timo Descamps (born 27 May 1986) is a Belgian actor and singer best known for his former roles on the soap operas Spring and Familie. In 2007, Descamps released his first music single, "Phonecall", which rose to 36 on the Ultratop 50. In 2010, it was announced that Descamps would be co-starring in the film Judas Kiss, playing the character of Shane Lyons.

Career

Television 
Timo's television debut was in 2004, appearing on the Belgian soap opera Familie. His character, Ghijs, was a problem child in the home of Marc and Mieke. After growing up and leaving home, Ghijs returned for the funeral of Marc and Lennart.

From 2005 to 2008, Descamps portrayed Jo De Klein, the new bass player of the music group in Spring. In his spare time, Jo was a painter and loved strange pets: he had a pet Tarantula called Mary and after its death he got a snake he named Picasso.

In 2006, Descamps competed on Steracteur sterartiest, a televised Belgian singing competition, finishing in third place. In 2009–2010, Descamps played the role of South African emigre Nelson Batenburg on the Dutch series SpangaS.

In addition to his acting roles, Descamps has worked as an onscreen host for Disney Channel The Netherlands & Flanders and for the Belgian VT4 Network. In 2007, he hosted the show Superstar: The Battle on Nickelodeon. He is currently hosting for OutTV.

Film 
Timo Descamps made his motion picture debut in the 2011 film Judas Kiss, released by Blue Seraph Productions, playing the privileged bad boy Shane Lyons. Judas Kiss is also Descamps' feature debut to an American and international audience.

Voice acting 
Prior to making his film debut with Judas Kiss in 2011, Descamps provided his voice for the Flemish adaptions of such films as 2006's Happy Feet, in which he voiced Mumble, 2007's Surf's Up, voicing protagonist Cody Maverick, and 2010s How to Train Your Dragon, voicing the lead of Hiccup.

Theatre 
In September 2008, Descamps played Dolf Vega in the musical version of Crusade in Jeans.

Personal life 
In 2009, Descamps publicly announced his homosexuality and relationship with Danny de Jong.

Discography 
In 2007, Descamps released his a single "Phonecall", which rose to number 36 on the Ultratop 50. Three years later, he released the single "Like It Rough". In 2011, Descamps released his third single, entitled "Tomorrow".

Filmography

Awards

References

External links 
 Official website
 
 Judas Kiss official website

1986 births
Living people
Flemish male film actors
Flemish male television actors
Flemish male voice actors
Gay singers
Belgian gay musicians
Belgian gay actors
Belgian LGBT singers
People from Kontich
21st-century Flemish male actors
21st-century Belgian male singers
21st-century Belgian singers
20th-century Belgian LGBT people
21st-century Belgian LGBT people